Thijs Westbroek (born 14 April 1995), better known by his stage name Brooks, is a Dutch disc jockey, record producer and electronic musician. He is best known for his collaborations with Martin Garrix ("Byte", "Like I Do") and David Guetta ("Better When You're Gone", "Like I Do"), as well as for his numerous high-profile remixes.

Career
Brooks' career as a disc jockey began when he sent his song to twenty random email addresses that could be related to Martin Garrix. To his delight, the song he sent was played by Garrix at a show. Not long after, Garrix contacted and told Brooks of his enthusiasm for his music. Garrix later invited him to his house to work on the "Byte" song. Brooks described the event as a "crazy story" and said he felt lucky.

Discography

Singles

As lead artist

Writing / production credits

Remixes

References

External links
Official website

Dutch DJs
Dutch electronic musicians
Future house musicians
Living people
Progressive house musicians
Musicians from Eindhoven
Electronic dance music DJs
Stmpd Rcrds artists
Spinnin' Records artists
Armada Music artists
1995 births